Mpadə is an Afro-Asiatic language spoken in northern Cameroon and southwestern Chad.  Dialects are Bodo, Digam, Mpade (Makari), Shoe (Shewe), and Woulki.

The language is sometimes known as Makari, after one of the towns where it is spoken.  Ngala further west (as described by Barth) once spoke a dialect similar to Makari, but it was moribund by the 1920s, the people having shifted to Kanuri.

Distribution
In Cameroon, Mpade is spoken throughout the northern end of the Logone-et-Chari department (Far North Region), adjacent to Lake Chad and centered on Makari (the northern part of Makari arrondissement as well as in Fotokol and Hilé Alifa arrondissements, and the northern part of Goulfey arrondissement). It is also spoken in Chad and Nigeria, it has a total population of 12,000 speakers (SIL 2000).

Phonology

Consonants 
Mpade has the following consonants.

Vowels 
Mpade has the following vowels.

Notes

References 
 Allison, Sean. 2006. Alphabet et orthographe de Kotoko de Makary (mpadɨ) (Makary Kotoko Orthography Statement) SIL manuscript, 31 pp. Available on-line
 Allison, Sean. 2020. A Grammar of Makary Kotoko. Leiden: Brill. .

Biu-Mandara languages
Languages of Chad
Languages of Cameroon